Charles Groom Clark (13 July 1883 – 6 August 1970) was a New Zealand cricketer. He played three first-class matches for Auckland in 1913/14.

An opening bowler, Clark took 5 for 108 in the second innings of his first first-class match in January 1914. He continued playing senior cricket well into his forties. In December 1926 he opened the bowling and took 7 for 16 and 6 for 110 as Taranaki defeated Wanganui to win the Hawke Cup for the first time. In February 1930, at the age of 46, he took 3 for 100 when Taranaki lost to the touring MCC.

Clark worked as a carpenter. He served overseas in World War I with the 1st New Zealand Cyclist Company of the New Zealand Expeditionary Force.

See also
 List of Auckland representative cricketers

References

External links
 

1883 births
1970 deaths
New Zealand cricketers
Auckland cricketers
Cricketers from Auckland
New Zealand military personnel of World War I